Merrimac railway station is a planned railway station on the Gold Coast Line in Queensland, Australia. It  will serve the Gold Coast suburbs of Merrimac, Worongary and Carrara, and will be located between Nerang and Robina stations.

History 

In November 2017, the Queensland Government committed to building three new in-fill stations on the Gold Coast Line as part of the AU$5.4 billion Cross River Rail project—Pimpama, Helensvale North and Merrimac. It is currently anticipated that more than 2,000 passengers will use Merrimac station per day when it becomes operational. The station is expected to cost up to $40 million to construct, and is planned to be open by 2024, in time for the commencement of services on the new Cross River Rail line.

The planned location for Merrimac station is off Gooding Drive, about 750 m (2500 ft) east of the Pacific Motorway interchange. The station will be integrated with other modes of public transport, and is planned to feature connections with pedestrian and bicycle paths. The station concept design currently includes space for 278 car park bays.

After the preliminary concept design details of Merrimac station were revealed by the Queensland Government in October 2019, City of Gold Coast councillor Glenn Tozer expressed concern over the station's planned location. He noted that road congestion in the station's proposed area was already an issue due to local school traffic and the lane merge at the Pacific Motorway interchange. Cr Tozer suggested an alternative location for the station about 1.6 km (1.0 mi) further north, off Elysium Road in the neighbouring suburb of Carrara. He claimed that this location would be ideal due to its proximity to an existing industrial precinct and the planned $1 billion Pacific View Estate major residential development.

References

External links 

Railway stations in Gold Coast City
Proposed railway stations in Australia

Railway stations scheduled to open in 2024